40/40 The Best Selection is a double compilation album by British-Australian singer Olivia Newton-John. It was released by Universal Music on 13 October 2010 in Japan, simultaneously with the box set 40th Anniversary Collection. The compilation was specially created for the Japanese market and was later remastered by Universal Music Japan and pressed on SHM-CD. The songs were selected by votes from Japanese fans for a limited release edition that includes a bonus track ("Come on Home"). 40/40 The Best Selection peaked at number 20 on the Japanese Albums Chart.

Track listing
Disc 1
 "Have You Never Been Mellow"
 "Hopelessly Devoted to You"
 "Sam"
 "Making a Good Thing Better"
 "Something Better to Do"
 "Don't Stop Believin'"
 "Sad Songs"
 "Compassionate Man"
 "Jolene"
 "Please Mr. Please"
 "Take Me Home, Country Roads"
 "Let It Shine"
 "If Not for You"
 "Don't Throw It All Away"
 "Let Me Be There"
 "Long Live Love"
 "If You Love Me (Let Me Know)"
 "Angel Eyes"
 "The Promise (The Dolphin Song)"
 "Summer Nights"

Disc 2
 "Xanadu"
 "Physical"
 "You're the One That I Want"
 "Heart Attack"
 "Twist of Fate"
 "Landslide"
 "I Need Love"
 "The Rumour"
 "Totally Hot"
 "Make a Move on Me"
 "Deeper Than the Night"
 "Magic"
 "Soul Kiss"
 "A Little More Love"
 "Suddenly"
 "Take a Chance"
 "Come on Over"
 "Slow Dancing"
 "Clearly Love"
 "I Honestly Love You"
 "Come on Home" (bonus track)

Charts

Release history

References

2010 compilation albums
Olivia Newton-John compilation albums